Andelsbuch is a municipality in the district of Bregenz in the Austrian state of Vorarlberg.

Population

Initiatives 

The Werkraum Bregenzerwald is an association of craftsmen in the Bregenz Forest founded in 1999. It aims at networking and supporting craft, design and technology businesses in the area. The publicly accessible place is used to present the craftsmanship, to promote building culture in cooperation with architects and to increase design competence and quality of craftsmanship with the preferred involvement of young people.

In 2013, the Werkraum Haus opened in the center of Andelsbuch. The house was planned by the well-known Swiss architect Peter Zumthor and built by the member companies of the Werkraum Bregenzerwald.

Notable people
Martina Rüscher (born 1972), politician (ÖVP)

References

External links

Vorarlberg
Bregenz Forest Mountains
Cities and towns in Bregenz District